Grammatica Litvanica is the first prescriptive printed grammar of the Lithuanian language which was written by Daniel Klein in Latin and published in 1653 in Königsberg, Duchy of Prussia.

Overview
The Grammatica Litvanica was printed in 1653 by Johann Reusner who arrived to Königsberg from Rostock in 1639. The checking of the manuscript of the Grammatica Litvanica was entrusted to Johann Lehmann, a priest of Lithuanian churches in Klaipėda. The Grammatica Litvanica mostly follows the traditional Latin grammarians scheme (also in some parts Greek and Hebrew grammars) while the lexical material was taken from the living Lithuanian language and writings. With this work Klein sought to prove that the Lithuanian language can also have its own grammar.

The dedication of the book contains emphasis that Duke Friedrich Wilhelm and the Prussian authorities takes care of publishing of the Lithuanian books. The preface of the book contains Klein's expression of gratitude for his helpers, described as great connoisseurs of the Lithuanian language: Didieji Rudupėnai (German: Enzuhnen) priest Kristupas (Kristoforas) Sapūnas, Katnava priest Johann Klein, Ragainė priest Johan Hurtel, Žiliai priest Friedrich Prätorius, Klaipėda priest Johann Lehmann, Verdainė (now part of the city of Šilutė) priest Vilhelmas Martinijus. The preface also contains criticism of those who opposed the Klein's grammar and did not believe in his work:

In 1654 Klein wrote a German-language summary of the Grammatica Litvanica titled Compendium  for the less educated Prussian officials.

The distinctive Lithuanian letter Ė was used for the first time in the Klein's Grammatica Litvanica and firmly established itself in the Lithuanian language; it is still in use today.

The Grammatica Litvanica and other grammars written by Klein had great significance for the development of Lithuanian linguistics as they systematically described the grammatical structure of the Lithuanian language for the first time, and established more stable general language norms, based on the dialect of Western Aukštaitians.

In 1643 Christophorus Sapphun wrote the Lithuanian grammar Compendium Grammaticae Lithvanicae slightly earlier than Klein, however the edited variant of Sapūnas's grammar was published only in 1673 by Theophylus Gottlieb Schultz. Despite the similar periods of publishing, philologists conclude that the foundations of the Grammatica Litvanica and the Compendium Grammaticae Lithvanicae grammars were laid by their authors independently of each other and that coincidences could have appeared later during the editing process of those grammars.

See also
 Universitas lingvarum Litvaniae – the oldest surviving grammar of the Lithuanian language published in the territory of the Grand Duchy of Lithuania
 Mokslas skaitymo rašto lietuviško – the first Catholic primer of the Lithuanian language
 Catechism of Martynas Mažvydas – the first printed book in the Lithuanian language, printed in 1547
 Postil of Jonas Bretkūnas – collection of sermons and Bible commentaries published in 1591
 Catechism of Mikalojus Daukša – the first Lithuanian Roman Catholic catechism published in 1595
 Catechism of Merkelis Petkevičius – the first Lithuanian Protestant (Calvinist) catechism published in the Grand Duchy of Lithuania in 1598

References

External links
 Online scanned version of the Grammatica Litvanica, 1653

Grammar books
1653 books
Lithuania Minor
Education in Königsberg
17th-century Latin books
Lithuanian books
Lithuanian grammar